Mohammed Al-Kharashi is a Saudi Arabian football manager.

Career
In the 1994 FIFA World Cup Asian qualifiers, he tool charge the Saudi Arabian national soccer team for their final match, after their original manager kendono was fired. He led Saudi Arabia to a 4-3 victory against Iran, leading them to qualify for the finals.

in the 1994 gulf tournament he lad them for their first title.

In the 1998 FIFA World Cup finals, he took charge of the Saudi Arabia national football team for their final group match, after original manager Carlos Alberto Parreira was fired after two losses and saw the team eliminated from contention. Saudi Arabia played South Africa to a 2–2 draw in that match.

References

Saudi Arabian football managers
1995 King Fahd Cup managers
1998 FIFA World Cup managers
Living people
Saudi Arabia national football team managers
Year of birth missing (living people)